Alexander Mudronja (born 3 September 1999) is an Australian professional basketball player who last played for the Illawarra Hawks of National Basketball League (NBL). He had a junior career with the Sturt Sabres before he joined the Centre of Excellence Program at the Australian Institute of Sport (AIS). Mudronja has also represented Australia nationally and won a gold medal at the FIBA Oceania competition. He was a member of the South Australian state basketball team when they won the U20 Men's Championships in 2017 and was awarded the Bob Staunton Award as the most outstanding player during the 2018 competition.

Mudronja trained with his hometown Adelaide 36ers at the end of his AIS stint but was instead encouraged to play collegiately for the Saint Mary's Gaels. After one season with the Gaels, Mudronja returned to Australia in 2019 and signed a three-year contract with the 36ers. 36ers head coach Joey Wright called Mudronja "the best point guard of his class in Australia". He was assigned as a development player during the 2019–20 season before he was elevated to a full roster position for the remainder of his contract. On 18 June 2021, Mudronja was released from the final season of his contract.

On 15 November 2021, Mudronja signed with the Illawarra Hawks on a three-year contract.

References

External links
NBL profile
College statistics

1999 births
Living people
Adelaide 36ers players
Australian Institute of Sport basketball players
Australian men's basketball players
Basketball players from Adelaide
Guards (basketball)
Illawarra Hawks players
Medalists at the 2019 Summer Universiade
People educated at Lake Ginninderra College
Saint Mary's Gaels men's basketball players
Universiade medalists in basketball
Universiade bronze medalists for Australia